Dusshera fair of Nimbahera is a ten-day fair which is organized during Navratras according to the Hindu calendar every year in Nimbahera, Chittorgarh district, Rajasthan state in western India. It is the second-largest fair of Rajasthan after Kota's. Many people come to this cultural fair, which is organized by the local municipality.

Festivals in Rajasthan
Chittorgarh district